The Seven Natural Wonders of Romania are the seven natural wonders of Romania, which were chosen in the Seven Natural Wonders of Romania contest held in July, 2008. It was the second stage of the Seven Wonders of Romania program started in 2007. The voting consisted of two parts: experts in Romania voted for their seven best sites, and internet users voted for their seven favorite sites on the official website.

The internet voting on the 16 possible candidates was opened on July 1, 2008 at the program's web-site. A total of around 60,000 internet users voted in the campaign. The voting was closed on July 24, 2008 and the results were officially announced two days later on July 26. The whole campaign was initiated in 2008 by the Evenimentul Zilei newspaper in an effort to teach Romanians about the beauty of the natural surroundings of their country. The same newspaper underwent in 2007 a similar national campaign to vote for the Seven Wonders of Romania that were exclusively manmade.

An interesting fact is the final table of the campaign because the winner, the Danube Delta, received 11.34% of the total votes. The Cheile Bicazului-Hăşmaş was the natural wonder that came just outside the top seven wonders, and needed only six more votes to topple the Sphinx and Babele. Initially there were only fourteen natural wonders on the list but at public demand two more have been added: the Cetăţile Ponorului and the Olt Defile.

Nominations
Three objects from the nomination list needed a special nomination: 
the Berca Mud Volcanoes, the only of their kind in Romania; 
the Iron Gates, one of the largest gorge in Romania; 
the Vânători-Neamț Natural Park.

Winners

See also
 Seven Wonders of the World
 Seven Wonders of Romania

References

External links
 
 

Tourist attractions in Romania
Romanian culture
Ancient history
Cultural lists